Nothing to Lose is the seventh studio album by American rock musician Eddie Money. The album was released on October 4, 1988, by Columbia Records. The top-ten hit "Walk on Water" featured a guest appearance from original band member Jimmy Lyon on lead guitar.

Track listing

Personnel
Drums: Mike Baird
Bass guitar: John Pierce
Keyboards, synthesizers: Kim Bullard, Kevin Gilbert, Jesse Harms, Eddie Money, Richie Zito
Guitars: John Nelson, Stevie Salas, Richie Zito, Jimmy Lyon
Saxophone: Danny Hull, Eddie Money, David Woodford 
Harmonica: Eddie Money
Backing vocals: Bobbie Eakes, Joe Esposito, Tommy Funderburk, Donny Gerrard, Joe Pizzulo, John Rowe, Annie Sampson, Bruce Sudano, Julia Tillman-Waters, Joe Turano, Luther Waters, Oren Waters, Maxine Willard-Waters

Production
Produced by Eddie Money and Richie Zito
Engineer: Phil Kaffel

Charts

References

External links

1988 albums
Eddie Money albums
Columbia Records albums